Restless Heart is an American country music band founded in 1984 by John Dittrich, Paul Gregg, Dave Innis, Greg Jennings, and Larry Stewart. Active from 1984 to 1994, in 1998, and from 2002 onward, the band has released eight studio albums, seven compilation albums, and two live albums. Its second through fifth studio albums—Wheels, Big Dreams in a Small Town, Fast Movin' Train, and Big Iron Horses—have all been certified gold by the Recording Industry Association of America (RIAA).

Restless Heart has also charted six number one singles on the Hot Country Songs chart: "That Rock Won't Roll", "I'll Still Be Loving You", "Why Does It Have to Be (Wrong or Right)", "Wheels", "The Bluest Eyes in Texas", and "A Tender Lie". Besides these songs, the band has nine other top ten singles on that chart. Two of the band's singles—"I'll Still Be Loving You" and "When She Cries"—both reached the top 40 on the Billboard Hot 100.

Studio albums

Compilation albums

Live albums

Singles

1980s

1990s–2010s

As a featured artist

Notes

Other charted songs

Videography

Music videos

Album appearances

References

Country music discographies
Discographies of American artists
Discography